"What Do You Love" is a song from Norwegian EDM record production trio Seeb, featuring vocals from British singer Jacob Banks. The song was written by Jayd Alexander, Hannes Netzell, Christian Olsson, Espen Berg and Simen Eriksrud, with the latter two handling the song's production. It was made available for digital download on 14 October 2016 through Seeb Music, Island Records, and Universal Music Group.

Charts

Certifications

Release history

References

2016 songs
2016 singles
Island Records singles
Republic Records singles
Seeb (music producers) songs
Universal Music Group singles
Tropical house songs
Song recordings produced by Seeb (music producers)
Songs written by Espen Berg (musician)
Songs written by Simen Eriksrud